Wainuiomata Rugby Football Club (WRFC) is a rugby union club based in Wainuiomata, an outlying suburb of Lower Hutt, New Zealand.
 
The club was formed in 1946 during the significant settlement of the area in the post-war era; mostly by young families attracted by the affordable new housing on offer.

The club has since been through many ups and downs. The 1980s were particularly successful with the club winning many lower-grade titles. However following the 1987 season many players defected to the rival Wainuiomata Rugby League Club, with the club relegated from the Premier ranks the following season. The club would not return to Wellington's top flight until 2006.

Since returning to the Swindale Shield Wainuiomata have won the Hardham Cup twice - in 2007 where they upset Oriental-Rongotai and again in 2010 when they defeated Avalon - and were runners-up to Upper Hutt in 2006 and Tawa in 2008. In 2011 the club qualified for the Jubilee Cup, finishing 7th, and qualified for the semi-finals in 2012.

The 2014 season was a stellar year for the club making its first appearance in the premier competition's Jubilee Cup Final against fierce local rivals, Hutt Old Boys-Marist. The fairytale season did not have a happy ending, going down in a tense final, 11-14.

The club has also enjoyed success with their second and third teams. The second side were promoted out of the Senior 2 competition in 2011 and retained their place in Senior 1 after the second round. In 2012 the second's qualified for the Hardham Cup as one of the top four eligible sides, where they finished 7th. The third side won the Senior 3 competition in 2012 and as eligible for promotion will play the 2013 year in the Senior 3 competition.

The club also fields Colts (U21), Under 85 kg restricted and Presidents grade (over 35's) sides at a senior level; and a large number of junior sides. The club maintains close links with Wainuiomata High School providing a pathway into senior rugby.

The club is based at William Jones Park which has an indoor training facility and a single field. Matches are also played at Mary Crowther Park a short distance away.

Piri Weepu and Jonah Lomu are the club's two All Blacks in its history, Weepu regularly playing for the team when circumstances allowed him too. Jonah Lomu played for the club twice in 2000 and 2001 and also represented the club when donning its club socks when appearing for the Barbarian F.C. in 2000.

Justin Va'a and Earl Va'a represented Manu Samoa including appearances at 2 Rugby World Cup tournaments.  Uale Mai was a long serving stalwart for the very successful Samoa national rugby sevens team and was named IRB International Sevens Player of the Year in 2006.

Local boys Tana Umaga and Neemia Tialata both played their senior club rugby at neighbours Petone, mostly during the period when Wainuiomata were outside the Premier ranks.

New Zealand rugby union teams
1946 establishments in New Zealand
Rugby clubs established in 1946
Sport in Lower Hutt